Christian Engelhart (born 13 December 1986) is a German racing driver. He was born in Ingolstadt, and has raced in such series as Porsche Supercup and Formula BMW ADAC.

Racing record

Career summary

Complete Porsche Supercup results
(key) (Races in bold indicate pole position; races in italics indicate fastest lap)

Complete Blancpain GT World Challenge Europe results
(key) (Races in bold indicate pole position; races in italics indicate fastest lap)

* Season still in progress.

Complete Deutsche Tourenwagen Masters results
(key) (Races in bold indicate pole position) (Races in italics indicate fastest lap)

References

External links 

 
 

1986 births
Living people
Sportspeople from Ingolstadt
Racing drivers from Bavaria
German racing drivers
Porsche Supercup drivers
24 Hours of Daytona drivers
Rolex Sports Car Series drivers
ADAC GT Masters drivers
WeatherTech SportsCar Championship drivers
24H Series drivers
Blancpain Endurance Series drivers
Porsche Motorsports drivers
Formula BMW ADAC drivers
Mücke Motorsport drivers
Deutsche Tourenwagen Masters drivers
Nürburgring 24 Hours drivers
24 Hours of Spa drivers
Porsche Carrera Cup Germany drivers
Toksport WRT drivers